Paragnetina fumosa, the smoky stone, is a species of common stonefly in the family Perlidae. It is found in North America.

References

Further reading

 
 
 
 
 
 
 
 

Perlidae
Insects described in 1902